Weidingen is a village in the commune of Wiltz, in north-western Luxembourg.  It is believed to be the only village in Luxembourg without a church. , the village has a population of 130.

It is the location of the FC Wiltz 71 football stadium, Stade Am Pëtz, since they moved there from the now demolished Stade Géitz.

Villages in Luxembourg
Wiltz